Matthew Edwards (born February 16, 2003) is an American soccer player who plays for the North Carolina Tar Heels.

Club career 
On July 11, 2020, Edwards debuted for Atlanta United 2 against the Tampa Bay Rowdies.

References

External links

2003 births
Living people
American soccer players
Association football midfielders
Atlanta United 2 players
Soccer players from North Carolina
USL Championship players